The Café is a talk show broadcast on Al Jazeera English which features discussions held in cafés around the world. Moderated by Al Jazeera correspondents, the discussions are held in a roundtable format between local leaders, activists and experts. The show premiered on 15 July 2011. The third season of the programme was presented by Mehdi Hasan.

Episodes

Season 1

Season 2

Season 3

References

External links
Official site

Al Jazeera English original programming